Gytha is a synonym for the ground spider genus Eilica.

Githa may also refer to:

 Gytha of Wessex (1053/1061–c. 1098), daughter of King Harold II of England
 Gytha Thorkelsdóttir (c. 997 - c. 1069), Danish noble, and mother of King Harold Godwinson and of Edith of Wessex
 Gytha Ogg, a character from Terry Pratchett's Discworld series

See also
 Githa (disambiguation)